Mystic Journey (foaled 26 September 2015) is a Group 1 winning Australian thoroughbred racehorse.

Background
Mystic Journey was sold for A$11,000 at the 2017 Tasmanian Magic Millions yearling sale.

Racing career
Mystic Journey commenced her career as a 2 year old winning her first three race starts, culminating with victory in the Elwick Stakes which took place at Tasmania’s Elwick Racecourse.

Mystic Journey tasted success as the 3/1 favourite in the Group 1 Australian Guineas at Flemington Racecourse.

In winning the Australian Guineas the filly became the first Tasmanian-prepared horse to win a Group 1 equivalent since Malua (St Albans {GB}), who won the 1886 Australian Cup.

Two weeks later Mystic Journey was the inaugural winner of the All Star Mile, collecting A$ 2,250,000 as first prizemoney.

As a 4YO mare Mystic Journey returned to Melbourne in the Spring of 2019 winning the Group 2 PB Lawrence Stakes at Caulfield Racecourse, before placing 2nd in the Group 1 Makybe Diva and running a gallant 5th in the Cox Plate behind Japanese superstar Lys Gracieux (JPN).

Breeding career

At the conclusion of her racing career, Mystic Journey was sold to Japanese owners as a broodmare for an undisclosed sum.

Pedigree

References 
 

2015 racehorse births
Racehorses bred in Australia
Racehorses trained in Australia